N-Acetylcysteine amide (abbrev. NACA, AD4 and also known as acetylcysteinamide) is an amide derivative of N-acetylcysteine that appears to have better blood–brain barrier permeability and bioavailability and a similar antioxidant capability.

References 

Acetamides
Thiols